A roll way or running pad is the pad placed on a concrete slab or on the ties on the outside of the  conventional track along both running rails of a rubber-tyred metro or along the unconventional track of a tram. The rubber-tyred wheels roll directly on the roll ways.
 With a conventional track: 
 The ones of the Montreal Metro are precast concrete on a concrete slab.
 The ones of the Paris Métro are H-steel on ties.
 The ones of the Mexico City Metro are H-steel.
 The ones of the Santiago Metro are precast concrete below ground and H-steel above ground.
 The ones of the Lausanne Metro Line M2 are H-steel.
 The ones of the Lyon Metro (lines A, B and D) are H-steel.
 Without a conventional track:
 The ones of the Lille Metro are precast concrete.
 The ones of the Toulouse Metro are precast concrete.
The ones of the Sapporo Municipal Subway are flat steel with a central guide rail 
 Busan Subway Line 4, runs directly on a concrete slab between guide bars
 Many people mover systems, such as Crystal Mover, run directly on concrete slabs or other surfaces between guide bars  
 Some guided buses, rubber-tyred trams, such as Translohr and Bombardier Guided Light Transit, use concrete slabs while being guided by a single central rail

Gallery

See also 
 The technology of rubber-tyred metros

External links 
 Visual dictionary 
 Truck and runway (bogie and roll way)
 Rail system
 VAL 

Permanent way